The One Hundred Twenty-sixth Ohio General Assembly was the legislative body of the state of Ohio in 2005 and 2006.  In this General Assembly, both the Ohio Senate and the Ohio House of Representatives were controlled by the Republican Party.  In the Senate, there were 22 Republicans and 11 Democrats. In the House, there were 60 Republicans and 39 Democrats.

Major events

Vacancies
December 1, 2005: Senator Mark Mallory (D-9th) resigns to become Mayor of Cincinnati, Ohio.
August 25, 2005: Representative Merle G. Kearns (R-72nd) resigns to take a position in the cabinet of Governor Bob Taft.
February 28, 2006: Senator Dan Brady (D-23rd) resigns.
February 28, 2006: Representative Dale Miller (D-14th) resigns to take a seat in the Ohio Senate.
May 25, 2006: Representative Kathleen Walcher Reed (R-58th) resigns.
July 27, 2006: Representative Dixie Allen (D-39th) resigns to become Montgomery County, Ohio Commissioner
December 31, 2006: Senator Jim Jordan (R-12th) resigns to take a seat in the United States House of Representatives.
December 31, 2006: Senator Charlie Wilson (D-30th) resigns to take a seat in the United States House of Representatives.
December 31, 2006: Senator Marc Dann (D-32nd) resigns to become Ohio Attorney General.

Appointments
October 5, 2005: Ross McGregor appointed as Representative of the 72nd District, succeeding Merle G. Kearns.
December 6, 2005: Eric Kearney appointed as Senator of the 9th District, succeeding Mark Mallory.
March 1, 2006: Dale Miller appointed as Senator of the 23rd District, succeeding Dan Brady.
May 25, 2006: Mike Foley appointed as Representative to the 14th District, succeeding Dale Miller.
May 25, 2006: Dan White appointed as Representative to the 58th District, succeeding Kathleen Walcher Reed.
November 14, 2006: Clayton Luckie appointed as Representative of the 39th District, succeeding Dixie Allen.

Leadership changes
August 25, 2005: Resignation of Merle G. Kearns as Majority Floor Leader corresponding with resignation.
January 15, 2006: Resignation of Chris Redfern as Minority Leader; Joyce Beatty subsequently made Minority Leader, and Todd Book Assistant Minority Leader.
March 31, 2006: Lance Mason resigns as Assistant Minority Whip; Fred Strahorn is selected to replace him.

Senate

Leadership

Majority leadership
 President of the Senate: Bill Harris
 President pro tempore of the Senate: Jeff Jacobson
 Floor Leader: Randy Gardner
 Assistant Majority Floor Leader: Robert Spada
 Whip: Steve Austria
 Assistant Majority Whip: Jay Hottinger

Minority leadership
 Leader: C.J. Prentiss
 Assistant Leader: Mark Mallory
 Whip: Teresa Fedor
 Assistant Whip: Bob Hagan

Members of the 126th Ohio Senate

House of Representatives

Composition

Leadership

Majority leadership
 Speaker of the House: Jon Husted
 Speaker Pro Tempore of the House: Chuck Blasdel
 Floor Leader: Merle G. Kearns (January 6, 2005 – August 25, 2005)
 Assistant Majority Floor Leader: Larry L. Flowers
 Majority Whip: Kevin DeWine
 Assistant Majority Whip: Jim Carmichael

Minority leadership
 Leader: Chris Redfern (January 6, 2005 – January 15, 2006), Joyce Beatty (January 15, 2006, December 31, 2006)
 Assistant Leader: Joyce Beatty (January 6, 2005 – January 15, 2006), Todd Book (January 15, 2006-)
 Whip: Steve Driehaus
 Assistant Whip: Lance Mason

Members of the 126th Ohio House of Representatives

Appt.- Member was appointed to current House Seat

See also
Ohio House of Representatives membership, 126th General Assembly
Ohio House of Representatives membership, 125th General Assembly

References
Ohio House of Representatives official website
Project Vote Smart - State House of Ohio
Map of Ohio House Districts
Ohio District Maps 2002-2012
Ohio House of Representatives: November 2, 2004 Ohio Secretary of State
Ohio Senate November 2, 2004 Ohio Secretary of State

Ohio legislative sessions
Ohio
Ohio
2005 in Ohio
2006 in Ohio

de:Repräsentantenhaus von Ohio